This is a list of rivers ( or ) on Taiwan Island in the Republic of China which are over :

Dongshan River - Yilan County - 
Lanyang River - Yilan County - 
Yilan River - Yilan County - 
Qingshui River - Yilan County - 
Luodong River - Yilan County - 
Shuang River - New Taipei City - 
Tamsui River - New Taipei City, Taoyuan City, Taipei City, Hsinchu County - 
Keelung River - New Taipei City, Taipei City, Keelung City - 
Xindian River - New Taipei City, Taipei City - 
Jingmei River - New Taipei City, Taipei City - 
Beishi River - New Taipei City, Yilan County - 
Nanshi River - New Taipei City - 
Dahan River (Takekan River) - New Taipei City, Taoyuan City, Hsinchu County - 
Sanxia River - New Taipei City - 
Nankan River - Taoyuan City - 
Fengshan River - Hsinchu County - 
Touqian River - Hsinchu County - 
Houlong River - Miaoli County - 
Da'an River - Miaoli County, Taichung City - 
Fanziliao River - Miaoli County
Dajia River - Taichung City - 
Dadu River (also known as the Wu or Black River) - Taichung City, Changhua County, Nantou County - 
Maoluo River - Taichung City, Changhua County, Nantou County - 
Nankang River - Taichung City - 
Zhuoshui River - Nantou County, Changhua County, Yunlin County - 
Qingshui River - Taichung City, Chiayi County, Tainan City - 
Shuili River - Taichung City - 
Wanta River - Taichung City - 
Kashe River - Nantou County - 
Beigang River - Yunlin County、Chiayi County - 
Tahukou River - Yunlin County - 
Sandie River - Chiayi County - 
Puzi River - Chiayi County - 
Bazhang River - Chiayi County, Tainan City - 
Touqian River - Tainan City - 
Jishui River - Tainan City - 
Guichong River - Tainan City - 
Baishui River (白水溪) - Tainan City - 
Zengwen River - Chiayi County, Tainan City, Tainan City - 
Houku River – Nantou County, Tainan City - 
Yanshui River - Tainan City - 
Erren River - Tainan City, Kaohsiung City - 
Agongdian River - Kaohsiung City - 
Fengshan River - Kaohsiung City - 
Dianbao River - Kaohsiung City - 
Gaoping River - Kaohsiung City, Pingtung County -  
Qishan River - Kaohsiung City, Pingtung County - 
Ailiao River - Kaohsiung City, Pingtung County - 
Wuluo River - Pingtung County
Laonong River - Kaohsiung City - 
Zhuokou River - Kaohsiung City - 
Donggang River - Pingtung County - 
Linbian River - Pingtung County - 
Beinan River - Taitung County - 
Xiuguluan River - Hualien County - 
Fuyuan River - Hualien County - 
Fengping River - Hualien County - 
Lekuleku River - Hualien County - 
Hualien River - Hualien County - 
Mukua River - Hualien County - 
Shoufeng River - Hualien County - 
Wanli River - Hualien County -

See also

 Geography of Taiwan
 List of mountains in Taiwan

External links
 Water Resources Agency, Ministry of Economic Affairs - Let's look at rivers (經濟部水利署-讓我們看河去)(traditional Chinese)
 
 The Hydrology of Taiwan
 Taiwan's Major Rivers

Taiwan
Rivers